Jonathan Poff (born 27 September 1983 in Christchurch, New Zealand) was a rugby union player who played for the London Wasps in the Aviva Premiership. Prior to joining Wasps, he played for Tasman in the ITM Cup competition in New Zealand and represented the Crusaders in Super Rugby.

Career
Poff, who grew up Cheviot, New Zealand, was selected for the NZ Secondary Schools in 2002 and in 2004 played in the NZ Colts team winning the cup in Scotland.   In 2007 Poff made the Crusaders squad, however got no game time. In 2009 he became the 139th Crusader against the Stormers. His first start was against the Lions in South Africa when he played the full eighty minutes. He was unlucky to have not received more game time in the 2009 campaign. Poff was reselected for the Crusaders 2010 and resigned for Tasman for two more years.
It was announced on 18 May 2011 that Poff was joining Aviva Premiership side London Wasps for the 2011–12 season where, on debut, he secured the man of the match award in the 20–15 victory over Saracens F.C.

References

New Zealand rugby union players
Living people
1983 births
Tasman rugby union players
Crusaders (rugby union) players
Wasps RFC players
Rugby union players from Christchurch
New Zealand expatriate rugby union players
New Zealand expatriate sportspeople in England
Expatriate rugby union players in England